The 6 Metre World Cup are biennial international sailing regattas in the 6 Metre class organized by the  International Six Metre Association.

The principal trophy is the Six Metre World Cup.  Swedish sailor Pelle Petterson has won most titles, with three titles between 1977 and 1983. Swiss sailor Bernard Haissly and Swedish Carl-Gustaf Piehl, have two each.

The most championships has been won by Swedish sailors, on eight occasions, followed by Swiss sailors, three titles, and sailors of Canada and the United States (two each).

The International 6 Metre was an Olympic class from 1908 to 1952.

History
The first 6 Metre World Cup were held in Seattle in 1973.

Editions

Medalists

See also
ISAF Sailing World Championships
International Sailing Federation

References

 
Recurring sporting events established in 1973